Ngondoma River is a river in Zhombe Communal Land, Kwekwe District in the Midlands province of Zimbabwe.

Location
Ngondoma River is in the Midlands Province, although some claim it to be in Mashonaland West Province. Rivers are usually identified at their mouths, and the place where Ngondoma River flows into Munyati River is indeed Mashonaland. Munyati River serves as a border of the two, set several metres on the Midlands side. Just before its confluence with Munyati River, it passes over Mabura Caves,  a bat guano mine in Somapani area of Zhombe.

Sources
Ngondoma River rises in the northwest of Zhombe in what was known as Ngondoma Crown Land,
However, the main drainage basin is the Mapfungautsi Forest on the Gokwe side of the river. 
It flows east and then northeast, 
where it forms part of the border with Gokwe, before entering the Munyati River.

Tributaries
The main tributaries of Ngondoma River are:
 Ufafi River  
 Mavulamachena River 
 Chebechebe River 
 Nevada River 
 Chevecheve River 
 Chikombera River

Ngondoma Dam
In 1967, the Ngondoma Dam was constructed on the river 67 km northwest of Kwekwe and 54 km southwest of Kadoma (by air). 
The dam holds more than 7 million cubic metres of water. It supplies the government managed Ngondoma Irrigation Scheme 900 000 cubic metres of water per year by a 5.8 km gravity driven concrete lined canal.

Bridges
Ngondoma River has two busy bridges. The larger one is across the Kwekwe-Gokwe Highway near Fafi School and the other one is on the Gokwe-Empress Road about 2 km down stream from the Ngondoma Dam.

See also
Empress Mine Township, Zimbabwe
 Zibagwe RDC
 Kwekwe-Gokwe Highway 
 Zhombe River

References

Rivers of Zimbabwe